Planet Parade is a 1984 drama film directed by Vadim Abdrashitov. The film's script was written by Aleksandr Mindadze and was based on the final part of the trilogy by Ukrainian writer Yevgeny Gutsalo, novel Planet Parade. Party primary contest 42nd Venice International Film Festival.

Plot
The film takes place in the USSR in 1984. Six forty-year-old men are cut off from ordinary life by draft for military reservists, the last one at their age. They represent a cross-section of the Soviet society of that time: an astronomer, a butcher from a shop, a factory worker, a loader, an architect, and a trolleybus driver (elected as people's deputy). Some of them know each other due to previous guerrilla assemblies and are friendly with each other, but by their own admission rarely spend time together — the reasons include work, mundane everyday life which leaves little time for leisure and, in general, differing interests and values. During the military exercises, their artillery battery, having successfully completed the task, was destroyed by the enemy, and the heroes, as ordered by the command, are seemingly dying. Thus, until the end of assembly, they remain in reserve for a few more days. Having missed the train to the city at the station, the heroes, having become "spirits from the other world", decide to finish the war game.

After leaving the training field of battle, the men begin a transcendental journey: they get to a city populated by only beautiful and solitary women. Having sailed across the river from this temptation, the detachment spends the night on the island and, taking the traveling chemist with them, end up in a retirement home, where by a clerk's mistake  they are taken for a team of technicians from the repair construction office.

In the retirement home, the feeble-minded old lady mistakes Herman Kostin for her son Fedya, who disappeared during the war. By the will of the circumstances, Herman-Fedya is forced to play this role for several hours, during which he sums up the not very pleasant aspects of his life. Late in the evening, seven travelers with all the elderly inhabitants are trying to observe the mysterious planet parade.

After spending the night in an open field near the village of Guskovo and traveling all the way to the city on foot, the team  of the men part, realizing that further men's games  military assembly and exercises   will not take place anymore, that the last stop has been placed in their departing youth, and most likely they will not meet again. Like planets with different orbits, they only met for a moment and lined up in a "planet parade" only to fly apart forever.

Cast

Lead roles
Oleg Borisov as Herman Ivanovich Kostin, astrophysicist, senior reserve lieutenant
Liliya Gritsenko as Anna Vasilyevna 
Aleksei Zharkov as Ruslan Slonov 
Pyotr Zaychenko as Ivan Pukhov 
Sergei Nikonenko as Vasily Sergeyevich Afonin, MP, driver of a trolley and an army truck
Aleksandr Pashutin as Spirkin, architect
Boris  Romanov as organic chemist
Sergey Shakurov  as Sultan, butcher from the deli

Supporting roles
Vladimir Kashpur as manager of the Nursing Home
Angelica Nevolina as Natasha, friend of Kostin
Elena Mayorova as Slonov's  girlfriend  
Marina Shimanskaya as Afonin's girlfriend  
Svetlana Evstratova as Spirkin's girlfriend
Lidia Ezhevskaya as   Pukhov's girlfriend
Tatyana Kochemasova as Sultan's girlfriend
Galina Shostko as Natalia Sergeevna
Boris Smorchkov as artillery captain
Liliya Makeeva as colleague of Kostin
Alekhen Nigata as astronomer
  Alexander Zvenigorsky as painter
 Pyotr Kolbasin as tankman

Awards 
 ICF Neo-Realistic Film in Avellino (1984)

References

External links

  Planet Parade on Mosfilm

Soviet drama films
1984 drama films
Soviet speculative fiction films
Mosfilm films
Films directed by Vadim Abdrashitov